Rhinoderma, commonly known as Darwin's frogs, is a genus of small frogs found in Chile and adjacent parts of Argentina. It has just two species, of which the Chile Darwin's frog (R. rufum) is highly endangered or may already be extinct. The better-known Darwin's frog (R. darwinii) is endangered.

Both species are notable for their unusual breeding, with the tadpoles being raised inside the mouths of the males. The eggs are laid on the ground. The male frog transports the tadpoles into his enlarged vocal sac. In the Chile Darwin's frog, the tadpoles are transported to a water source and released for the duration of their development. In Darwin's frog, they reside in the vocal sac until metamorphosis. They may carry between five and 15 offspring. Darwin's frogs are separated into a separate family based purely upon this behavioural adaptation, which is unique among frogs.

Darwin's frogs are small, reaching a size of only  in length. They are predominantly brown or green frogs, and have long, narrow noses. They are primarily terrestrial.

References

 

Taxa named by André Marie Constant Duméril
Taxa named by Gabriel Bibron